Arvīds Immermanis (9 September 1912 – July 1947) was a Latvian cyclist. He competed in the individual and team road race events at the 1936 Summer Olympics.

He competed and finished in first place in four Latvian Cycling championships; 1934 sprint race, 1935 and 1937 team road race and track cycling. Immermanis won three first places in the Latvian National Cycling competition, Vienības brauciens (Unity Ride in Latvia), from 1936 until 1938. Immermanis worked at the G. Ērenpreis Bicycle Factory.

He died in a Soviet prison camp in 1947.

References

External links
 

1912 births
1947 deaths
Latvian male cyclists
Olympic cyclists of Latvia
Cyclists at the 1936 Summer Olympics
Sportspeople from Riga
Latvian people who died in Soviet detention
Gulag detainees